is a railway station in Inage-ku, Chiba, Japan, operated by the Keisei Electric Railway.

Lines
Keisei Inage Station is served by the Keisei Chiba Line. It is located 8.1 km from the terminus of the line at Keisei-Tsudanuma Station.

Station layout
Keisei Inage Station has two opposed side platforms connected by a level crossing.

Platforms

History

On 18 October 1931, it was renamed Keisei Inage Station.

Station numbering was introduced to all Keisei Line stations on 17 July 2010; Keisei Inage Station was assigned station number KS55.

References

External links

 Keisei Station layout 

Railway stations in Japan opened in 1921
Railway stations in Chiba Prefecture